Donald "Mr. Nice Guy" Brian Rickerby Hamilton (born February 18, 1937) is a Canadian retired professional and amateur box lacrosse goaltender and a professional ice hockey goaltender.  Hamilton was considered an elite goaltender in his time and is a member of the Canadian Lacrosse Hall of Fame.  He is remembered as the only goaltender to have completed a shutout in a Mann Cup national championship game.

Career
Hamilton became a goaltender at the age of 12 because of an asthma condition. Hamilton joined the Western Lacrosse Association's Victoria Shamrocks in 1956 as a fill-in for injured starter Geordie Johnston.  He would back-up Johnston for the next two seasons while leading his Jr. Shamrocks team to two consecutive Minto Cup finals. From 1955 until 1958, Hamilton tended goal in the Western Hockey League for the Seattle Americans and the Victoria Cougars.

In 1960, Hamilton moved to Vancouver and joined the Vancouver Burrards.  On September 23, 1961, Hamilton would become the first and only goaltender during the box lacrosse era to record a shutout in Mann Cup play, blanking the Brampton Ramblers 13-0.
In 1962, at the height of his career, Hamilton was forced to step away from lacrosse when work forced him to move to Kamloops, British Columbia.  While there, he founded their Senior B team and their minor lacrosse association while acting as its first president.
In 1968, Hamilton rejoined the Burrards and turned professional with the National Lacrosse Association.  This lasted for two seasons.

Don Hamilton retired from lacrosse with the Burrards in 1976 after winning two Mann Cups in three attempts during his career. Hamilton returned as general manager in 1977, and won another Mann Cup. Hamilton was the Western Manager of Team Canada at the World Lacrosse Championships in 1982.

Honours
Hamilton was inducted into the Canadian Lacrosse Hall of Fame in 1990.

Statistics
''Source: Wamper's Bible of Lacrosse and Stan Shillington's "Who's Who in Lacrosse 1933-2013: Goaltending Records".

References 

Canadian lacrosse players
Lacrosse people from British Columbia
Sportspeople from Vancouver
1937 births
Living people